Gaza War may refer to:
Gaza War (2008–2009), also known as Operation Cast Lead, the Gaza Massacre, and the Battle of al-Furqan 
2012 Israeli operation in the Gaza Strip, or Operation Pillar of Defense
2014 Gaza War, or Operation Protective Edge
2021 Israel–Palestine crisis

See also
 Battle of Gaza (disambiguation)
 Gaza conflict (disambiguation)
 Gaza–Israel conflict